is a Japanese swimmer. In 2019, he represented Japan at the 2019 World Aquatics Championships held in Gwangju, South Korea. He competed in the men's 4 × 200 metre freestyle relay event.

In 2018, he represented Japan at the 2018 Summer Youth Olympics in Buenos Aires, Argentina. In the boys' 400 metre freestyle event he won the bronze medal and in the boys' 800 metre freestyle event he won the silver medal. In 2019, he won the gold medal in the men's 400 metre freestyle event at the 2019 Summer Universiade in Naples, Italy.

References

External links
 

Living people
2000 births
Place of birth missing (living people)
Japanese male freestyle swimmers
Swimmers at the 2018 Summer Youth Olympics
Universiade medalists in swimming
Universiade gold medalists for Japan
Medalists at the 2019 Summer Universiade
21st-century Japanese people